Yiorgos Theotokas, formally Georgios Theotokas (Γεώργιος Θεοτοκάς; 27 August 1905 – 30 October 1966), was a Greek novelist.

Biography

He was born in Constantinople (now Istanbul, Turkey).

He became one of the main representatives of the "Generation of the '30s". After studying in Athens, Paris, and London, his first essay was Free Spirit (1929). This was followed by  three novels before World War II: Argo (1936), The Demon (1938), and Leonís (1940). His first and most influential novel, Argo, dealt with the problems of young people growing up in difficult and turbulent times.

After the war he became more involved with the theatre, and was twice director of the Greek National Theatre.

Today he is perhaps best remembered for his friendship and correspondence with major figures of the Generation of the Thirties including the Nobel prize-winner George Seferis; but Argo remains in print.

He died in Athens.

Bibliography

Novels
 Αργώ (Argo), Vol. 1: 1933, Vol. 2: 1936
 Το Δαιμόνιο (The Demon), 1938
 Λεωνής (Leonís), 1940
 Ασθενείς και Οδοιπόροι (Patients and Travellers), Part 1 (Ιερά Οδός): 1950, full edition: 1964
 Οι Καμπάνες (The Bells), 1970
 Σημαίες στον ήλιο (Flags in the Sun), including Λεωνής and Παιδική ηλικία (Childhood), 1985

Short stories
 Ευριπίδης Πεντοζάλης και Άλλες Ιστορίες (Evripidis Pendozalis and other stories), 1937

Essays
 Ελεύθερο Πνεύμα (Free Spirit), 1929 (using the pseudonym Ορέστης Διγενής - Orestis Digenis)
 Εμπρός στο Κοινωνικό Πρόβλημα, 1932
 Στο κατώφλι των Νέων Καιρών, 1945
 Προβλήματα του Καιρού Μας, 1956
 Πνευματική Πορεία, 1961

Plays
 Αντάρα στ' Ανάπλι (Scud in Nafplion)
 Το Γεφύρι της Άρτας
 Όνειρο του Δωδεκάμερου
 Το Κάστρο της Ωριάς
 Το Παιχνίδι της Τρέλας και της Φρονιμάδας
 Συναπάντημα στην Πεντέλη
 Το Τίμημα της Λευτεριάς
 Πέφτει το Βράδυ
 Αλκιβιάδης
 Ο Τελευταίος Πόλεμος
 Λάκαινα
 Σκληρές Ρίζες
 Η Άκρη του Δρόμου

Travel literature
 Δοκίμιο για την Αμερική (Essay for America)
 Ταξίδι στη Μέση Ανατολή και στο Άγιον Όρος (Journey to Middle East and Mount Athos), 1961
 Ταξίδια: Περσία, Ρουμανία, Σοβιετική Ένωση, Βουλγαρία (Journeys: Persia, Romania, Soviet Union, Bulgaria)

Other works
 Ώρες Αργίας (Leisure Hours), 1931
 Ημερολόγιο της "Αργώς" και του "Δαιμονίου" (Diary of "Argo" and "the Demon"), 1939
 "Τετράδια Ημερολογίου 1939-1953" (Diary Books 1939-1953)
 Στοχασμοί και Θέσεις (RPonderings and Positions), Political texts: 1925-1949 & 1950-1966, Vol. 1 & 2
 Η Ορθοδοξία στον Καιρό Μας (Orthodoxy in Our Times)
 Μια Αλληλογραφία (A Correspondence of Letters)

Translations
 Leonis, tr. Donald E. Martin (1985)
 Argo, tr. E. M. Brooke, A. Tsatsopoulos (1951)

References

 Αράγης, Γ., Γιώργος Θεοτοκάς, Συλλογή: Η Μεσοπολεμική πεζογραφία. Από τον πρώτο ως τον δεύτερο παγκόσμιο πόλεμο (1914-1939), Vol. 4, ed. Σοκόλης, Athens 1992. p. 8-81.
 Ν. Ι. Καγκελάρης, «Γ. Θεοτοκάς, Αργώ: Οι Φιλικοί Ασημάκης Κορκίδης και Μάνθος Οικονόμου πίσω από τον πρώτο Νοταρά (1771-1824)», Μικροφιλολογικά 42 (2017): 62-4  
 Α. Καραντώνη, Πεζογράφοι και πεζογραφήματα της γενιάς του '30, ed. Παπαδήμας, Athens 1977. 
 Κ. Μητσάκη, Νεοελληνική πεζογραφία. Η γενιά του '30, Athens 1977.
 Marc Terrades, Le Drame de l'hellénisme. Ion Dragoumis (1878-1920) et la question nationale en Grèce au début du XXe siècle, L'Harmattan, 2005. .
 Mario Vitti, Η γενιά του τριάντα. Ιδεολογία και μορφή, ed. Ερμής, Athens 1977.
 Γιαλουράκης Ε., Θεοτοκάς Γιώργος, Μεγάλη Εγκυκλοπαίδεια της Νεοελληνικής Λογοτεχνίας, ed. Εκδοτική Αθηνών, 1985.
 «Διαβάζω» Magazine, 12. 2. 1986, "Αφιέρωμα στον Γιώργο Θεοτοκά"

Further reading
 T. Doulis, George Theotokas (1975)  (Twayne's world authors)

External links
 ‘Theatrical Group of Tripoli’ (in Greek)

1906 births
1966 deaths
Constantinopolitan Greeks
Greek novelists
Generation of the '30s
Greeks from the Ottoman Empire
20th-century novelists
Greek short story writers
Emigrants from the Ottoman Empire to Greece
Greek expatriates in the United Kingdom
Greek expatriates in France
Writers from Istanbul
Lawyers from Istanbul